The Schottenstein Edition of the Babylonian Talmud is a 20th-century, 73-volume edition of the Babylonian Talmud (Talmud Bavli) featuring an elucidated translation and commentary, and published by ArtScroll, a division of Mesorah Publications.

It is the first Orthodox non-academic English translation of the Babylonian Talmud since the Soncino Edition.
It has gained much popularity since its release and is used in many congregations throughout the English-speaking world; 
it is now published in three languages:  English, French, and Modern Hebrew. 

Rabbis Chaim Malinowitz and Yisroel Simchah Schorr are the general editors of the project. Nothing was considered final until Malinowitz approved the finished drafts.

History
The first volume, Tractate Makkos, was published in 1990, and dedicated by Mr. and Mrs. Marcos Katz. 
Subsequent editions were produced with the financial assistance of Jerome Schottenstein, an Orthodox Jew and founder of an Ohio department store. 
The total cost of the project was $40,000,000 (including the Hebrew edition); some sources estimate the cost of production for each volume to be $250,000. The publication of all 73 volumes took fifteen years.

Structure
Each page of the Hebrew/Aramaic text is in the classic Vilna style, with various classical commentaries (such as Rashi) surrounding the text of the Mishnah and Gemara. Each Hebrew page is opposite a page of English translation—one Hebrew folio takes approximately six to eight pages of English to translate. The literal meaning of the text is shown in bold, while supplementary words and phrases that ease the quick transition of topics are shown in regular font.

The English-language commentary is primarily based on Rashi's, and describes his continuing importance as follows: 

The editors explained further that they chose Ran's commentary for Tractate Nedarim as an exception, based on a belief that the commentary attributed to Rashi for this tractate was not written by Rashi.

See also
 Gemara
 Mishnah
 Soncino Edition of the Babylonian Talmud
 Steinsaltz Talmud
 Talmud

References

External links
Artscroll's website
 Information on the Talmud
Additional information on the Schottenstein Edition 

1984 non-fiction books
Talmud versions and translations
Translations into English
Sifrei Kodesh